Tama Glacier is a glacier flowing to the sea between Tensoku Rock and Manju Rock on the coast of Queen Maud Land. Mapped from surveys and air photos by Japanese Antarctic Research Expedition (JARE), 1957–62, and named Tama-hyoga (ball glacier).

See also
 List of glaciers in the Antarctic
 Glaciology

References

Glaciers of Queen Maud Land
Prince Olav Coast